Neoregelia sarmentosa is a species of flowering plant in the genus Neoregelia. This species is endemic to Brazil.

Cultivars
 Neoregelia 'Aurora'
 Neoregelia 'Berta'
 Neoregelia 'Crown Fire'
 Neoregelia 'Dolly Bird'
 Neoregelia 'Fall In Love'
 Neoregelia 'Flash Lady'
 Neoregelia 'Frog Prince'
 Neoregelia 'Godsend'
 Neoregelia 'Green Eyes'
 Neoregelia 'Jean Evans'
 Neoregelia 'Kathy'
 Neoregelia 'Maid Of Honour'
 Neoregelia 'Marathon'
 Neoregelia 'Multicolor'
 Neoregelia 'Nana'
 Neoregelia 'Nocturne'
 Neoregelia 'Redneck'
 Neoregelia 'Sara Lee'
 Neoregelia 'Scarlet Star'
 Neoregelia 'Yellow Bird'

References

BSI Cultivar Registry Retrieved 11 October 2009

sarmentosa
Flora of Brazil